Acapulco Gold is a strain of cannabis.

Acapulco Gold may also refer to:

Music 
 "Acapulco Gold" (Paul Horn Quintet), a 1966 jazz song
 That Acapulco Gold, a 1967 psychedelic pop album
 "That Acapulco Gold" (song), a song from the album
 "Acapulco Gold Filters", a 1971 Cheech & Chong song
 "Acapulco Gold" (Roy Harper song), a 1974 rock song
 "Acapulco Gold" (Soulwax song), a song from the 1996 album Leave the Story Untold
  Acapulco Gold (Band), a German rock band active in the 1970s and 1980s

Other uses 
 Acapulco Gold (film)
 Acapulco Gold (clothing brand)

See also 
 "Acapulco Goldie", a rock song